Guntis Džeriņš (born February 17, 1985) is professional Latvian ice-hockey player, who used to play for MHC Martin of Slovak Extraliga. He made his first World championships with team Latvia in 2009. He has younger brother Andris Džeriņš who plays hockey as well.

References

1985 births
Living people
People from Madona Municipality
MHC Martin players
Latvian ice hockey forwards
Latvian expatriate sportspeople in Slovakia
Latvian expatriate ice hockey people
Expatriate ice hockey players in Slovakia